An antecedent is the first half of a hypothetical proposition, whenever the if-clause precedes the then-clause. In some contexts the antecedent is called the protasis.

Examples:

 If , then .

This is a nonlogical formulation of a hypothetical proposition. Antecedent and consequent are connected via logical connective to form a proposition. 

 If  is a man, then  is mortal.

" is a man" is the antecedent for this proposition.

 If men have walked on the moon, then I am the king of France.

Here, "men have walked on the moon" is the antecedent.

Let . If  then

See also
 Consequent
 Affirming the consequent (fallacy)
 Denying the antecedent (fallacy)
 Necessity and sufficiency

References

Conditionals